Libyan Jamahiriya Broadcasting Corporation (LJBC) was the state-run broadcasting organization in Libya under the rule of Muammar Gaddafi. It distributed news in coordination with the Jamahiriya News Agency in accordance with state laws controlling Libya media.

On 22 August 2011, the organization was rendered defunct when its channels were taken off-air by anti-Gaddafi fighters, which had entered Tripoli the previous day.

Organization 
The corporation's website and online presence was serviced by fifty employees, mostly journalists. They were organized into four departments; news editing, programming, design, and maintenance and operations, based in offices in  Tripoli.

Stations

Television
Stations run by the LJBC include:
 Al-Jamahiriya TV – the official state television channel with news and entertainment
 Al-Madina TV – an entertainment channel
 Al-Jamahiriya Satellite Channel – international satellite channel
 Al Mounawaa
 Al Hidaya Al Libiya
 Al Shababiyah – youth programming
 Al Libiya (formerly Al Jamahiriya 2) – a general entertainment channel
 Al Badeel
 Al Jamahiriya TV English – English speaking channel
 Libya Al Riadhiya – Sports channel

Radio
 Radio Jamahirya 103.4 MHz – generalist program in Arabic
 Voice of the Libyan People – international shortwave radio broadcasts

Al-Jamahiriya TV 

Al-Jamahiriya TV was a television channel broadcast by the Libyan Jamahiriya Broadcasting Corporation. The channel broadcast mainly Libyan Aljamahiriya discussions, cultural programs and news bulletins. It was available in three languages: Arabic, English and French.

Emphasis was left to the official Libyan political and government activities, with live coverage of sessions of the People's Congress, speeches of the "Guide of the Revolution" (the official position held by Colonel Gaddafi) and readings of The Green Book, written by the Libyan leader, and published in 1975.

The channel started in the morning and ended in the evening by reading verses from the Koran and the dissemination of the national anthem, before giving way to a focus and national radio.

The Libyan national television was broadcast via satellite to the Arab world and Europe via the satellites Arabsat and Hot Bird from 1997.

On 22 August 2011, the station was taken off-air by the National Transitional Council forces, which had entered Tripoli the previous day.

See also 
Media in Libya
 Hala Misrati

References

External links 
LJBC homepage (Internet Archive copy as of July 23, 2011: original site is no longer live)

Mass media in Libya
Government-owned companies of Libya
Television networks in Libya
Television channels and stations established in 1969
Television channels and stations disestablished in 2011